Reactive sulfur species (RSS) are a family of sulfur-based chemical compounds that can oxidize and inhibit thiol-proteins and enzymes. They are often formed by the oxidation of thiols and disulfides into higher oxidation states. Examples of RSS include persulfides, polysulfides and thiosulfate.

See also 
 Reactive oxygen species
 Reactive nitrogen species
 Reactive carbonyl species

References

Molecules
Sulfur compounds